Joseph Merrick (August 1808 – 22 October 1849) was a Jamaican Baptist missionary who, assisted by Joseph Jackson Fuller, established the first successful mission on the Cameroon coast of Africa.

Biography 
Merrick was born in August 1808 in Jamaica.

Merrick began preaching in 1837 in Jamaica and was ordained a full missionary in 1838. In 1842, Reverend John Clarke and Dr. G. K. Prince, members of the Baptist Missionary Society of London, were seeking Jamaican lay missionaries to join them on an expedition to the Cameroon coast. Merrick signed on. The party reached England on 8 September 1842, and arrived at Spanish-controlled Santa Isabel on the island of Fernando Po in 1843.

Ministry 
The following year, 1844, Merrick visited Bimbia and spoke to King William of the Isubu people to request permission to establish a church on the mainland. Despite some initial resistance, the king acquiesced. Merrick founded the Jubilee Mission in 1844–5, and over the next four to five years, translated parts of the New Testament into the Isubu language, set up a brick-making machine and a printing press, and used the latter to publish his Bible translation and a textbook for teaching in Isubu. Merrick made excursions into the interior, as when he climbed Mount Cameroon and when he became the first non-African to visit the Bakoko people.

In 1849, Merrick was in ill health. He set off for England on furlough, and on 22 October, he died at sea. On Merrick's death, Joseph Jackson Fuller took charge of the mission station and congregation at Bimbia. Merrick's efforts also paved the way for Alfred Saker to make further progress – he made use of Merrick's printing press to translate and print the Bible in Duala. Joseph Merrick Baptist College in Ndu, Northwest Province, Cameroon, is named for him.

Notes

References

 DeLancey, Mark W., and Mark Dike DeLancey (2000): Historical Dictionary of the Republic of Cameroon (3rd ed.). Lanham, Maryland: The Scarecrow Press.
 Fanso, V. G. (1989). Cameroon History for Secondary Schools and Colleges, Vol. 1: From Prehistoric Times to the Nineteenth Century. Hong Kong: Macmillan Education Ltd.
 Ngoh, Victor Julius (1996). History of Cameroon Since 1800. Limbe: Presbook.
 Sundkler, B. & Steed, C. (1993)  A History of the Christian Church in Africa

Baptist missionaries in Cameroon
Jamaican Baptist missionaries
Translators of the Bible into Bantu languages
Explorers of Africa
Jamaican explorers
1808 births
1849 deaths
19th-century translators
Jamaican expatriates in Cameroon
Jamaican expatriates in Equatorial Guinea
Baptist missionaries in Equatorial Guinea
19th-century Baptists
Missionary linguists
People who died at sea
Linguists from Jamaica